Viera Tomanová (born February 5, 1948) is a Slovak politician, former Minister of Labour of Slovakia under Prime Minister Robert Fico.
As a Minister she became known for her wild statements and many controversies, claiming her dog was poisoned in her house, prompting Prime Minister Fico to accuse Slovak journalists of the deed. She was popular among the elderly citizens for establishing "Christmas pensions", 13th state pensions issued out in December.

Career 
She studied Economy at Vysoká škola ekonomická in Bratislava and Social Work at Trnavská univerzita in Trnava.
 1972 – 1977: Head secretary of the Director of PZCR Javorina, Bratislava 
 1978 – 1982: Head of the social, labour and housing department on MNV Bratislava-Petržalka
 1982 – 1986: Director of the Retirement home on Hanulova Street in Bratislava
 1986 – 1987: Social and labour department of DPHMB Bratislava city magistrate
 1988 – 2003: Head of the Social department and Vice Director

Since 1994 Tomanová is a university teacher at Katedra zdravotníctva a sociálnej práce Trnavskej univerzity and since 2005 also at Vysokej škole zdravotníctva a sociálnej práce sv. Alžbety.

Ministerial career 
In 2006, Tomanová became the Minister of Labour, Social matters and Family of Slovakia.

When leaving the office in 2010, she warned the journalists at a press conference of the new government's changes in the social system and called the plan to establish a tax bonus a "neutron bomb".

References 

1948 births
Living people
Women government ministers of Slovakia
Members of the National Council (Slovakia) 2010-2012
21st-century Slovak women politicians
Members of the National Council (Slovakia) 2012-2016
Labour ministers of Slovakia
Female members of the National Council (Slovakia)